Athletics at the 1984 Summer Paralympics consisted of 447 events.

Participating nations

Medal summary

Medal table

Men's events

Women's events

Mixed events

References 

 

Australia]
 

 
1984 Summer Paralympics events
1984
Paralympics